Deutsche Schule Bogotá is a German international school in Bogota, Colombia. It serves levels Kindergarten through Bachillerato/Sekundarstufe (senior high school).

See also

 German Colombian

References

External links
  Deutsche Schule Bogotá
  Deutsche Schule Bogotá

International schools in Bogotá
Bogota
Educational institutions established in 1922
1922 establishments in Colombia